The 2019 Central Connecticut Blue Devils football team represents Central Connecticut State University in the 2019 NCAA Division I FCS football season. They are led by first-year head coach Ryan McCarthy. They play their home games at Arute Field as a member of the Northeast Conference.

Previous season

The Blue Devils finished the 2018 season 6–5, 4–2 in NEC play to finish in third place.

Preseason

Preseason coaches' poll
The NEC released their preseason coaches' poll on July 24, 2019. The Blue Devils were picked to finish in third place.

Preseason All-NEC team
The Blue Devils had six players at three positions selected to the preseason all-NEC team.

Offense

Tyshaun James – WR

J'Von Brown – OL

Connor Mignone – OL

Cole Phelps – OL

Defense

Tajik Bagley – DB

DJ Exilhomme – DB

Schedule

Game summaries

at Fordham

Merrimack

at Valparaiso

at Eastern Michigan

at Sacred Heart

at Columbia

Bryant

LIU

at Wagner

Saint Francis

Robert Morris

at Duquesne

FCS Playoffs
The Blue Devils received an automatic bid (due to winning their conference) for the postseason tournament, with a first-round pairing against Albany.

at Albany–First Round

Ranking movements

References

Central Connecticut
Central Connecticut Blue Devils football seasons
Northeast Conference football champion seasons
Central Connecticut
Central Connecticut Blue Devils football